Casino New Brunswick is located in the Magnetic Hill Area of Moncton, New Brunswick, Canada.

Casino Complex
On May 8, 2008, Sonco Gaming New Brunswick Limited Partnership was selected as the successful proponent for the New Brunswick Destination Casino Project. The agreement with the New Brunswick Lotteries and Gaming Corporation (NBLGC) was signed on July 15, 2008, and construction of the complex was underway in October 2008 by Atlantic Canada's Marco Group at a cost of around $90-million.
The complex contains a casino, hotel, entertainment center, and dining establishments. The casino opened in 2010.

In May 2015, Sonco Gaming agreed to sell the casino to Great Canadian Gaming for $95 million.

See also
 List of casinos in Canada

References

External links
 
 ewallet slot
 Football Betting Website

Casinos in New Brunswick
Casinos completed in 2010
Buildings and structures in Moncton
Tourist attractions in Moncton
Music venues in New Brunswick
Hotels in New Brunswick
Restaurants in New Brunswick
Casino hotels